The 1978 Segunda División de Chile was the 27th season of the Segunda División de Chile.

Santiago Wanderers was the tournament's champion.

Table

See also
Chilean football league system

References

External links
 RSSSF 1978

Segunda División de Chile (1952–1995) seasons
Primera B
Chil